Counted-thread embroidery is any embroidery in which the number of warp and weft yarns in a fabric are methodically counted out for each stitch, resulting in uniform-length stitches and a precise, uniform embroidery pattern. Even-weave fabric is usually used, producing a symmetrical image, as both warp and weft yarns are evenly spaced.

The opposite of counted-thread embroidery is free embroidery.

Types of counted-thread embroidery
Among the counted-thread embroidery techniques are:

Assisi
Bargello, or Florentine work
Blackwork
Canvas work
Cross-stitch
Hardanger
Needlepoint
Drawn thread work

See also
Pixel art

Embroidery